Stephen D. Mull (born April 30, 1958) is a Senior Foreign Service officer who was most recently the Acting Undersecretary of State for Political Affairs. He previously served as United States Ambassador to Poland, Acting Assistant Secretary of State for Political-Military Affairs and United States Ambassador to Lithuania.

Ambassador Mull holds the rank of Career Ambassador, the highest diplomatic rank in the United States Foreign Service.

On September 18, 2015, Mull was appointed as the United States Lead Coordinator for Iran Nuclear Implementation, tasked with carrying out the terms of the Joint Comprehensive Plan of Action by United States Secretary of State John Kerry.

Biography
Mull was born in Reading, Pennsylvania. He graduated from Georgetown University with a Bachelor of Science degree in International Politics in 1980.

Mull is a career member of the Senior Foreign Service in the class of Career Ambassador. He previously served as the Deputy Chief of Mission in Jakarta, Indonesia, and has served as a Consular or Political Officer for the U.S. Missions in Poland, the Bahamas, and South Africa since the beginning of his career in the Foreign Service in 1982.

Prior to his assignment in Jakarta, Mull worked as Deputy Director of the State Department Operations Center, as Political Counselor at the U.S. Embassy in Warsaw, Poland, as Director of the Office of Southern European Affairs in the Bureau of European Affairs, and as Deputy Executive Secretary in the Office of the Secretary of State.

On March 10, 2003, then-U.S. President George W. Bush nominated Mull as the U.S. Ambassador to Lithuania. After being confirmed by the Senate, he assumed his position on August 26, 2003. He completed his tour of duty on July 18, 2006.

On April 30, 2009, Mull testified before the U.S. Senate Foreign Relations Committee on international efforts to combat piracy off the coast of Somalia.

Mull is married to Cheri Stephan. The Mulls have one child, Ryan.

Ambassador to Poland
Stephen Mull was appointed the United States Ambassador to Poland on October 24, 2012. He speaks Polish fluently.

Awards
Director General's Award for Political Reporting, 1988
Superior Honor Award (four times)
Balker-Wilkins Award
Presidential Meritorious Service Award, 2003
 Order of Merit of the Republic of Poland (5th Class), 1997
 Order for Merits to Lithuania (3rd Class), 2006
 Order of Polonia Restituta (2nd Class), 2015

References

External links

|-

|-

|-

|-

|-

1958 births
Living people
Ambassadors of the United States to Lithuania
Ambassadors of the United States to Poland
Georgetown University alumni
Knights of the Order of Merit of the Republic of Poland
Obama administration personnel
Politicians from Reading, Pennsylvania
United States Assistant Secretaries of State
United States Career Ambassadors
United States Foreign Service personnel